Esperanza Baur Díaz (born Esperanza Díaz Ceballos; July 17, 1920 – March 10, 1961) was a Mexican actress, and was the second wife of John Wayne.

Biography
Born Esperanza Díaz Ceballos, nicknamed "Chata", she appeared in a small number of Spanish language films, both in leading and supporting roles.

Esperanza met John Wayne in 1941 in Mexico City while he was vacationing there.  At the time, he was still married to his first wife, Josephine Alicia Saenz, but that marriage ended December 25, 1945.  Esperanza and John were married on January 17, 1946, in Long Beach, California.

Their marriage was rocky and volatile from the start because she was reportedly jealous of his devotion to his work and to his four children; they had no children of their own.  "Our marriage was like shaking two volatile chemicals in a jar", Wayne said.  Esperanza accused Wayne of having an affair with Gail Russell, his leading lady in Angel and the Badman, which he denied.  There were charges and counter-charges of unfaithfulness, drunken violence, emotional cruelty, and "clobbering".  Wayne described his wife as a "drunken partygoer who would fall down and then accuse him of pushing her."  Esperanza was accused of having an affair with hotel heir Nicky Hilton during divorce proceedings.  They separated in May 1952; in the end the marriage lasted eight years, coming to an end on November 1, 1954.

Esperanza died of a heart attack in 1961.

Filmography
 Guadalajara (1943) – Hortensia
 The Count of Monte Cristo (1942)
 Una luz en mi camino (1939)
 La Valentina (1938) – Valentina
 Jalisco Nunca Pierde aka Jalisco Never Loses (1937)

References

External links

 
 Genealogy.com
 Emanuel Levy

1920s births
1961 deaths
20th-century Mexican actresses
Actresses from Mexico City
John Wayne